Renée Adorée Taylor (née Wexler; born March 19, 1933) is an American actress, screenwriter, playwright, producer and director. Taylor was nominated for an Academy Award for co-writing the screenplay for the film Lovers and Other Strangers (1970). She also played Sylvia Fine on the television sitcom The Nanny (1993–1999).

Early years 
Taylor was born on March 19, 1933, in The Bronx, New York City, to Charles and Frieda (née Silverstein) Wexler, an aspiring actress. Her mother named her after silent film actress Renée Adorée. She graduated from the Academy of Dramatic Arts.

Career
Taylor acted with improv groups in the 1950s. She worked as a comedian in the early 1960s at the New York City nightclub Bon Soir. Her opening act was a then-unknown Barbra Streisand. In 1967, Taylor played an actress portraying Eva Braun in Mel Brooks' feature film The Producers,  a role she got while performing the play Luv with Gene Wilder, whom Brooks cast as protagonist Leo Bloom.

Taylor and husband Joseph Bologna co-wrote the Broadway hit comedy Lovers and Other Strangers, and received Academy Award nominations for writing the 1970 film adaptation. In 1971, the couple co-wrote and starred in the film Made for Each Other. Their screenplay received a nomination for the Writers Guild of America Award for Best Comedy. Taylor played Arlene Sherwood, co-producer of a television show along with Jerry Orbach and John Candy in the 1991 film Delirious.

From 1992 to 1994, Taylor played the overbearing Jewish mother of Brian Benben's lead character on the HBO series Dream On. In 1993, she was cast as the mother of Richard Lewis, and the ex-wife of Don Rickles, in the Fox sitcom Daddy Dearest, which was cancelled after a two-month run in the fall.

Also in 1993, Taylor was slated for sporadic guest appearances on the new CBS sitcom The Nanny, playing Sylvia Fine, the mother of Fran Drescher's title character. After the cancellation of Daddy Dearest, Taylor was upgraded to a recurring cast member during the first season of The Nanny and eventually a full-time cast member by the third season. Her roles on the two broadcast network series in 1993 were concurrent with her work on Dream On. 
 
Taylor is most often recognized for her role  in The Nanny. Her character was intent on helping daughter Fran find a husband and had a passionate love for food. Taylor's husband, Joseph Bologna, made two guest appearances on The Nanny—first, as an egomaniacal actor named Allan Beck, who tormented Maxwell Sheffield (Charles Shaughnessy) and second, in the final season, as a doctor and admirer of Sylvia in the episode, "Maternal Affairs".

Between 2008 and 2012, Taylor guest-starred as Ted Mosby's neighbor, Mrs. Matsen, on How I Met Your Mother. She also had a guest-starring role on the Disney Channel series Shake It Up, portraying a cranky elderly woman, Mrs. Lacasio, in a retirement home. She also had a guest-starring role on the Nickelodeon series Victorious, as Robbie's cranky grandmother who wants to learn how to use the Internet. Like Sylvia Fine, Taylor's character on Victorious also has a husband named Morty.

In addition to her numerous guest-starring appearances, Taylor has worked as a voice-actor as the character Mrs. Start in the animated feature film Ice Age: The Meltdown, and in a recurring role as Linda's mother Gloria in the animated Fox series Bob's Burgers. Taylor also played Martha Benson in the film Opposite Day, released in 2009.

Taylor also appeared on Fran Drescher's latest show Happily Divorced as the best friend of Fran's mother. In 2011, Taylor was cast in the  short-lived Fox cartoon Allen Gregory, in which she voiced the character of Principal Gottlieb. In 2013, she starred in the Tyler Perry film Temptation: Confessions of a Marriage Counselor as Ms. Waco Chapman, the owner of Chapman Drug Company.

In 2016, Taylor starred in the Netflix movie The Do-Over with Adam Sandler as the role of Mrs. Kessler and in the TV show Rock in a Hard Place. Taylor followed that with an appearance in the 2017 film How to Be a Latin Lover.

Taylor had a role in Tango Shalom, which she acted alongside her husband, Joseph Bologna in his final film role before his death. The film was released theatrically in North America on September 3, 2021, and on VOD,DVD in North America on October 29, 2021. 
 Beginning July 25, 2018, Taylor appeared in My Life on a Diet at the Off-Broadway Theatre at St. Clement's, written with Bologna.
After two extensions, she took the production on tour across the U.S.

Personal life
Taylor married actor Joseph Bologna on August 7, 1965, in Stamford, Connecticut. They had a son, filmmaker, Gabriel who directed his parents in the last film they starred in together, "Tango Shalom." They were married until Bologna's death in August 2017.

Taylor is Jewish.

Filmography

Film

Television

Accolades 
The following is a list of awards and nominations received by Renee Taylor:

Notes

References

External links

1933 births
Living people
20th-century American actresses
21st-century American actresses
20th-century American writers
21st-century American Jews
Actresses from New York City
American film actresses
American stage actresses
American television actresses
Jewish American actresses
Primetime Emmy Award winners
Writers from the Bronx